Manickam Tagore is an Indian politician and current Member of Parliament of India, representing Virudhunagar, Tamil Nadu.

He earlier represented the constituency  in the 15th Lok Sabha from 2009 to 2014. He is a member of the Indian National Congress party.

Positions held

References

Living people
India MPs 2009–2014
Indian National Congress politicians from Tamil Nadu
Lok Sabha members from Tamil Nadu
United Progressive Alliance candidates in the 2014 Indian general election
People from Virudhunagar district
1975 births
India MPs 2019–present